Ermelinde Wertl was an Austrian international table tennis player.

She won nine World Table Tennis Championship medals from the 1951 World Table Tennis Championships to the 1955 World Table Tennis Championships.

She married a physician in 1954 and played as Ermlinde Wertl-Rumpler afterwards.

See also
 List of table tennis players
 List of World Table Tennis Championships medalists

References

2004 deaths
Austrian female table tennis players
World Table Tennis Championships medalists